"Christmas Flintstone" (also known as "How The Flintstones Saved Christmas" on VHS releases) is a Christmas episode from season 5 of the animated television series The Flintstones, which aired on ABC on December 25, 1964. The episode is about Fred Flintstone taking over the role of Santa Claus.

The episode is followed by three Christmas-themed Flintstones specials: A Flintstone Christmas (1977), A Flintstone Family Christmas (1993) and A Flintstones Christmas Carol (1994). It has been released on DVD.

Plot
Fred gets a part-time job at Macyrock's department store in order to help finance the family's Christmas. Mr. Macyrock (voiced by Mel Blanc) initially fires Fred for falling into an out-of-order elevator shaft, but when Mr. Macyrock's assistant tells him that their usual Santa Claus is sick, he instead rehires Fred to be Santa. During his stint as Macyrock's store Santa, Fred entertains the children and customers by singing "Christmas is My Fav'rite Time of Year" and "Dino the Dinosaur". Mr. Macyrock tells Fred that he is the best Santa that Macyrock's ever had.

On Christmas Eve, two of Santa's elves named Twinky and Blinky, both of whom are 385–420 years old, appear to Fred at Macyrock's during closing hours. They explain to Fred that the real Santa Claus is sick and ask him to substitute for Santa and deliver presents to children around the world. Throughout his journey to countries worldwide on Santa's sleigh, Fred shouts Christmas greetings in French, Italian, German, Dutch, English and Swedish and also sings a reprise of "Christmas is My Fav'rite Time of Year".

Voice cast
 Alan Reed as Fred Flintstone
 Jean Vander Pyl as Wilma Flintstone, Pebbles Flintstone, Customer
 Mel Blanc as Barney Rubble, Dino, Mr. Macyrock
 Gerry Johnson as Betty Rubble, Gift-wrapping Lady, Girl #1
 Don Messick as Bamm-Bamm Rubble, Kid #1, Reporter, Blinky
 Hal Smith as Santa Claus, Streetcrosser, Dinosaur
 Dick Beals as Kid #2, Twinky

Songs
 "Christmas is My Fav'rite Time of Year"
 "Dino the Dinosaur"
 "Christmas is My Fav'rite Time of Year" (reprise)

Production
First broadcast in 1964, the episode was produced and directed by Joseph Barbera and William Hanna, under Hanna-Barbera.

Legacy
Turner Home Entertainment released the episode on VHS as "How The Flintstones Saved Christmas". Warner Home Video released the episode on DVD in Region 1 on October 2, 2007, along with the 1994 special A Flintstones Christmas Carol.

"Christmas Flintstone" marked the first of four Christmas-themed The Flintstones animated works. It is followed by A Flintstone Christmas (1977), A Flintstone Family Christmas (1993) and A Flintstones Christmas Carol (1994).

References

External links
 

The Flintstones
1964 American television episodes
American Christmas television episodes
Animated television episodes